Seman, Semans or SEMAN may refer to:

 Seman River in Albania
 Seman, Alabama, a populated place in the United States
 Seman, Iran, a village
 Semans, Saskatchewan, a village in Canada

People with the name 
 Bill Seman (born c. 1944), Canadian football player
 Daniel Seman (born 1979), Czech ice hockey player
 George Seman (1930–1966), American police officer
 Marek Seman (born 1976), Slovak football player
 Mary Semans (1920–2012), American politician, and philanthropist
 Stanislav Seman (born 1952), Czechoslovak football player
 Seman Laxfield ( 1397–1404), English politician